Lesticus viridicollis is a species of ground beetle in the subfamily Pterostichinae. It was described by W.S.Macleay in 1825.

References

Lesticus
Beetles described in 1825